Boyarskaya is a rural locality (a village) in Stepanovskoye Rural Settlement.  Kudymkarsky District, Perm Krai, Russia. The population was 9 as of 2010.

Geography 
Boyarskaya is located 16 km southwest of Kudymkar (the district's administrative centre) by road. Borisova is the nearest rural locality.

References 

Rural localities in Kudymkarsky District